Josip Bodrožić, a retired Australian–Croatian super heavyweight kickboxer, was born on 20 June 1973, in Melbourne, Australia.  He was 2 meters tall and during his competitive career weighed approximately 120 kilograms.

Biography and career
At the age of 13 Bodrožić moved with his family to Kaštel Gomilica. He became active in amateur kickboxing, and competed in the European and World Championships until 2000, when he turned professional. Two of his most noted accomplishments were bronze medals at W.A.K.O., world championships under full contact rules 1997 in Gdańsk and again in 1999 in Caorle.

In 2000, as a professional, Bodrožić began competing overseas, often in K-1 promotions. His most famous fight was against Bellarusian Alexey Ignashov in 2003 at the K-1 Final Fight Stars War in Zagreb, the capital of Croatia—an event promoted by Orsat Zovko. Bodrožić lost the five-round fight by a split decision.

In Ugento, Italy in 2004, Bodrožić became the W.P.K.C. super heavyweight muay thai world champion, beating Hungarian Peter Varga in five rounds, dropping him down several times. In April 2004, he participated in K-1 Italy's Grand Prix 2004 in Milan losing to Jörgen Kruth in the semi finals.

In June 2004, Bodrožić became the K-1 Grand Prix BIH 2004 tournament champion. He won over Dževad Poturak in the quarter finals, had a walkthrough in the semi finals and finally won the tournament in a bout against Serbian Duško Basrak.

Titles
Professional
2004 K-1 Grand Prix BIH tournament champion
2004 WPKC Muay Thai Super Heavyweight World Champion +95 kg

Amateur
1999 W.A.K.O. World Championships   +91 kg 
1997 W.A.K.O. World Championships   +91 kg

Professional kickboxing record

|-
|-  bgcolor="#FFBBBB"
| 2005-11-11 || Loss ||align=left| Cătălin Zmărăndescu || Local Kombat 17 || Brașov, Romania || Decision || 3 || 3:00
|-  bgcolor="#CCFFCC"
| 2005-09-16 || Win ||align=left| Aurel Bococi || Local Kombat 16 "Liga Campionilor" || Cluj Napoca, Romania || TKO || 4 ||
|-
|-  bgcolor="#FFBBBB"
| 2004-12-10|| Loss ||align=left| Ionuţ Iftimoaie || Local Kombat 11 || Romania || Decision || 3 || 3:00
|-  bgcolor="#CCFFCC"
| 2004-10-22 || Win ||align=left| Alex Jucan || Local Kombat 10 || Brăila, Romania || KO || 2 ||
|-  bgcolor="#FFBBBB"
| 2004-07-16 || Loss ||align=left| Alexey Ignashov || Kings of Oceania 2004 || Auckland, New Zealand || KO || 1 ||
|-
|-  bgcolor="#CCFFCC"
| 2004-06-11 || Win ||align=left| Duško Basrak || K-1 Grand Prix BIH 2004, Final || Široki Brijeg, BIH || KO || 2 ||
|-
! style=background:white colspan=9 |
|-
|-  bgcolor="#CCFFCC"
| 2004-06-11 || Win ||align=left| Dževad Poturak || K-1 Grand Prix BIH 2004, quarter-finals || Široki Brijeg, BIH || KO || 2 ||
|-
|-  bgcolor="#FFBBBB"
| 2004-04-24 ||Loss ||align=left| Jörgen Kruth || K-1 Italy Grand Prix 2004 in Milan, semi-finals || Milan, Italy || KO (Right overhand) || 3 || 2:59
|-  bgcolor="#CCFFCC"
| 2004-04-24 ||Win ||align=left| Marc de Wit || K-1 Italy Grand Prix 2004 in Milan, quarter-finals || Milan, Italy || Decision (Unanimous) || 3 || 3:00
|-  bgcolor="#CCFFCC"
| 2004 || Win ||align=left| Peter Varga ||  || Ugento, Italy || Decision (Unanimous) || 5 || 3:00
|-
! style=background:white colspan=9 |
|-
|-  bgcolor="#CCFFCC"
| 2004-02-28 || Win ||align=left| Cheik Ouedrago  || Kombat Festival || Genoa, Italy || KO ||  ||
|-
|-  bgcolor="#FFBBBB"
| 2003-10-31 ||Loss ||align=left| Alexey Ignashov|| K-1 Final Fight Stars War in Zagreb || Zagreb, Croatia || Decision (Split) || 5 || 3:00
|-  bgcolor="#CCFFCC"
| 2003-09-12 || Win ||align=left| Hiriwa Te Rangi || K-1 Final Fight || Spalato, Croatia|| RTD ||3 ||
|-  bgcolor="#FFBBBB"
| 2003-07-27 ||Loss ||align=left| Peter Graham || K-1 World Grand Prix 2003 in Melbourne || Melbourne, Australia || Decision || 3 || 3:00
|-  bgcolor="#CCFFCC"
| 2003-04-11 || Win ||align=left| Andrew Peck || K-1 Lord of the Rings || Auckland, New Zealand || KO (Punch) || 1 ||

See also

List of WAKO Amateur World Championships
List of WAKO Amateur European Championships
List of K-1 champions
List of K-1 events
List of male kickboxers

References

External links
Profile at k-1sport.de

1973 births
Living people
Croatian male kickboxers
Heavyweight kickboxers
SUPERKOMBAT kickboxers